Luis Miguel Navas (born 1980) is a baseball player for Cuba. He was part of the Cuban team which won a silver medal at the 2008 Summer Olympics. He plays shortstop.

References

1980 births
Living people
2009 World Baseball Classic players
Olympic baseball players of Cuba
Baseball players at the 2007 Pan American Games
Baseball players at the 2008 Summer Olympics
Olympic silver medalists for Cuba
Olympic medalists in baseball
Medalists at the 2008 Summer Olympics
Pan American Games gold medalists for Cuba
Pan American Games medalists in baseball
Medalists at the 2007 Pan American Games